USS Colorado may refer to:

 , a three-masted steam screw frigate in commission from 1858–1876
 , a Pennsylvania-class armored cruiser in commission from 1905–1927
 , a Colorado-class battleship in commission from 1923–1947
 , a Virginia-class nuclear-powered fast attack submarine commissioned in 2018, in active service

In fiction:
 USS Colorado (SSBN-753), a fictional Ohio-class submarine featured in the 2012 TV series Last Resort

United States Navy ship names